Dypsis tsaratananensis is a species of flowering plant in the family Arecaceae. It is found only in Madagascar.

References

tsaratananensis
Endemic flora of Madagascar
Data deficient plants
Taxonomy articles created by Polbot
Taxa named by Henri Lucien Jumelle